Given names of Soviet origin appeared in the early history of the Soviet Union, coinciding with the period of intensive word formation, both being part of the so-called "revolutionary transformation of the society" with the corresponding fashion of neologisms and acronyms, which Richard Stites characterized as a utopian vision of creating a new reality by means of verbal imagery. They constituted a notable part of the new Soviet phraseology.

Many such names may be found in Russian, Belarusian, and Ukrainian persons, as well as in other ethnicities of the former Soviet Union (e.g. Tatar.)

History
The proliferation of the new names was enhanced by the propagation of a short-lived "new Soviet rite" of Octobering, in replacement of the religious tradition of child baptism in the state with the official dogma of Marxist–Leninist atheism.

In defiance of the old tradition of taking names from menology, according to the feast days, many names were taken from nature having patriotic, revolutionary, or progressive connotation: Beryoza (Берёза, "birch tree", a proverbial Russian tree), Gvozdika (Гвоздика, "carnation", a revolutionary flower), Granit (Гранит, "granite"), Radiy (Радий, "radium", a symbol of scientific progress). A peculiarity of the new naming was neologisms based on the revolutionary phraseology of the day, such as Oktyabrin/Oktyabrina, to commemorate the October Revolution, Vladlen for Vladimir Lenin.

Richard Stites classifies the Soviet "revolutionary" names into the following categories:
Revolutionary heroes and heroines (their first names, their last names used as first names and various acronyms thereof)
Revolutionary concepts (exact terms and various acronyms)
Industrial, scientific and technical imagery
Culture, myth, nature, place names

Most of these names were short-lived linguistic curiosities, but some of them fit well into the framework of the language, proliferated and survived for a long time.

Common new names
The following names were quite common and may be found in various antroponymic dictionaries.

People with Soviet names

: Баррикад, from "barricade" 
Elem Klimov: Эле́м = Engels, LEnin, Marx
Elmira (name): Эльмира, backronym for "электрификация мира", elektrifikatsiya mira (electrification of the world)
Engelsina Markizova: Энгельси́на.
Geliy Korzhev: Гелий = "helium" 
Aleksandr Gelyevich Dugin: Patronym = Ге́льевич. Father's name: Geliy = "helium"
: Изиль = исполнитель заветов Ильича, ispolnitel zavetov Il'icha (Performer of the Testaments of Il'ich (Lenin))
Igor Talankin: birth name: Индустрий (Industriy)
Iskra Babich: И́скра, in reference to Iskra, the revolutionary newspaper, the name of which means "spark"
Marlen Khutsiev: Марле́н = Marx + Lenin
Melor Sturua: Мэлор = "Marx, Engels, Lenin: Organizers of the Revolution"
: Нинель = "Lenin" read backwards
Nonna Mordyukova: born Ноябри́на (Noyabrina), from Noyabr = "November"; October Revolution (which happened in November by Julian calendar)
Aleksei Oktyabrinovich Balabanov: Patronym = Oктябpинoвич. Father's name: Октябри́н = October
: Радий (Radiy) = "radium"
Radner Muratov: Раднэ́р = радуйся новой эре, raduysya novoy ere ("Hail the new era") 
: Рево́льт
Rem Viakhirev:  Рем = революция мировая, revolyutsiya mirovaya (World revolution)
: Рэм = Революция, Энгельс, Маркс (Revolution, Engels, Marx)
Rimma Kazakova, birth name Remo, Рэмо = Революция, электрификация, мировой Октябрь, revolyutsiya, elektrifikatsiya, mirovoy Oktyabr (Revolution, Electrification, World's October)
Spartak Mishulin: Спартак = "Spartacus"
Telman Ismailov: Те́льман, from Ernst Thälmann
Vil Mirzayanov: Вил, from VIL = Vladimir Ilyich Lenin
: Вилен, VILen  = Vladimir Ilyich Lenin
: VILen  = Vladimir Ilyich Lenin
Willi Tokarev: Вилли, born Vilen
: Віллен (Ukrainian)
: Виль
: Владилен
Vladilen Mashkovtsev 
: Владлен
Vladlen Davydov
Vladlen Yurchenko
Zhores Alferov: Жоре́с, after Jean Jaurès
Zhores Medvedev: after Jean Jaurès

See also 
 :ru:Список имён советского происхождения - the list of such names

References

Given names
Soviet culture
Soviet phraseology